Rob Cross may refer to:

 Rob Cross (basketball), American college basketball coach
 Rob Cross (darts player) (born 1990), English darts player

See also
 Robert Cross (disambiguation)